It's Never Too Late may refer to:

 It's Never Too Late (1953 film), an Italian comedy directed by Filippo Walter Ratti
 It's Never Too Late (1956 film), a British comedy directed by Michael McCarthy
 It's Never Too Late (TV series), a Scottish TV series presented by Tam Cowan
 "It's Never Too Late" (Batman: The Animated Series), an episode of the TV series Batman: The Animated Series
 It's Never Too Late (Monk Montgomery album)
 It's Never Too Late (Tommy Emmanuel album)
 "It's Never Too Late", a song by Diana Ross from Why Do Fools Fall in Love
 "It's Never Too Late", a single from the Steppenwolf album At Your Birthday Party
 "It's Never Too Late", a song by Carole King from the album Colour of Your Dreams

See also
 Never Too Late (disambiguation)